Erthesina is a genus of stink bugs in the family Pentatomidae. There are at least two described species in Erthesina.

Species
These two species belong to the genus Erthesina:
 Erthesina acuminata
 Erthesina fullo (Thunberg, 1783)

References

External links

 

Shield bugs